Vanda Semerádová (born 1978) is a Czech slalom canoeist who competed at the international level from 1994 to 2004.

She won a gold medal in the K1 team event at the 2003 ICF Canoe Slalom World Championships in Augsburg.

References

Czech female canoeists
Living people
1978 births
Medalists at the ICF Canoe Slalom World Championships